Badr El-Din El Doud Abdalla (Galag)is a Sudanese football midfielder currently playing for Al-Merriekh. Galag is also appearing in Al-Hilal portsudan and in the Sudan national team as right winger .

He is a member of the Sudan national football team.

International goals

External links 

1981 births
Living people
Sudanese footballers
Sudan international footballers
Association football midfielders
2008 Africa Cup of Nations players
2011 African Nations Championship players
2012 Africa Cup of Nations players
Al-Merrikh SC players
People from Port Sudan
Sudan A' international footballers